Luther H. Story (July 20, 1931 – September 1, 1950) was a soldier in the United States Army during the Korean War. Story joined the US Army in October 1948. He posthumously received the Medal of Honor for his actions on September 1, 1950 during the Battle of Yongsan. 

Posthumously named for Story is the Luther Story Bridge over the Flint River in his native state of Georgia.

Medal of Honor citation
Rank and organization Private First Class, U.S. Army, Company A, 9th Infantry Regiment, 2nd Infantry Division

Place and date: Near Agok, Korea, September 1, 1950

Entered service at: Georgia. Born: July 20, 1931, Buena Vista, Georgia

G.O. No.: 70, August 2, 1951

Citation:

Pfc. Story, distinguished himself by conspicuous gallantry and intrepidity above and beyond the call of duty in action. A savage daylight attack by elements of 3 enemy divisions penetrated the thinly held lines of the 9th Infantry. Company A beat off several banzai attacks but was bypassed and in danger of being cut off and surrounded. Pfc. Story, a weapons squad leader, was heavily engaged in stopping the early attacks and had just moved his squad to a position overlooking the Naktong River when he observed a large group of the enemy crossing the river to attack Company A. Seizing a machine gun from his wounded gunner he placed deadly fire on the hostile column killing or wounding an estimated 100 enemy soldiers. Facing certain encirclement the company commander ordered a withdrawal. During the move Pfc. Story noticed the approach of an enemy truck loaded with troops and towing an ammunition trailer. Alerting his comrades to take cover he fearlessly stood in the middle of the road, throwing grenades into the truck. Out of grenades he crawled to his squad, gathered up additional grenades and again attacked the vehicle. During the withdrawal the company was attacked by such superior numbers that it was forced to deploy in a rice field. Pfc. Story was wounded in this action, but, disregarding his wounds, rallied the men about him and repelled the attack. Realizing that his wounds would hamper his comrades he refused to retire to the next position but remained to cover the company's withdrawal. When last seen he was firing every weapon available and fighting off another hostile assault. Private Story's extraordinary heroism, aggressive leadership, and supreme devotion to duty reflect the highest credit upon himself and were in keeping with the esteemed traditions of the military service.

See also

List of Medal of Honor recipients
List of Korean War Medal of Honor recipients

Notes

References

External links
 Luther Story Bridge historical marker

1931 births
1950 deaths
United States Army Medal of Honor recipients
American military personnel killed in the Korean War
People from Buena Vista, Georgia
Korean War recipients of the Medal of Honor
Military personnel from Georgia (U.S. state)
Military personnel missing in action
United States Army personnel of the Korean War